Sergey Gavrilets is a Russian-born American physicist turned theoretical biologist, and currently a Distinguished Professor at the University of Tennessee. He uses mathematical and computational models to study complex biological and social processes. He has made contributions to the study of speciation, sexual selection, fitness landscapes, sexual conflict, social complexity, evolutionary game theory, social norms, homosexuality, social norms, and cultural evolution. He is currently Associate Director for Scientific Activities at the National Institute for Mathematical and Biological Synthesis. In 2017, he was elected a Fellow of the American Academy of Arts and Sciences.

Gavrilets has contributed to the book Evolution: The Extended Synthesis (Edited by Massimo Pigliucci and Gerd B. Müller, 2010).

Publications 

Books

References

Year of birth missing (living people)
Living people
University of Tennessee faculty
21st-century American biologists
Extended evolutionary synthesis
Moscow State University alumni